Jacobaea adonidifolia is a species (synonym Senecio adonidifolius) of the genus Jacobaea and the family Asteraceae.

References

External links

adonidifolia